Bandar is a village in Rabatat Rural District, Kharanaq District, Ardakan County, Yazd Province, Iran. At the 2006 census, its population was 22, in 8 families.

References 

Populated places in Ardakan County